Thorarinn Gunnarsson is the pseudonym of an American author of science fiction and fantasy. For several years, he claimed to be of Icelandic birth but eventually admitted that this (along with much of his biography) was false.

His 1990s novels Make Way For Dragons!, Human, Beware! and Dragons on the Town featured a dragon named Dalvenjah Foxfire for whom DALnet is (indirectly) named.  Dragon's Domain appears to take place much earlier in the same continuity, establishing some elements of the setting.

Bibliography

Starwolves series
 Starwolves Warner Books 1988 
 Battle of the Ring Warner Books 1989 
 Tactical Error Warner Books 1991 
 Dreadnought Questar Warner Books 1993

Song of the Dwarves series
 Song of the Dwarves 1988
 Revenge of the Valkyrie 1989

Dragons series
 Make Way for Dragons! 1990
 Human, Beware! 1990
 Dragons on the Town 1992
 Dragon's Domain 1993

Dragonlord Chronicles
 Dragonlord of Mystara 1994 
 Dragonking of Mystara 1995 
 Dragonmage of Mystara 1996

References

External links

20th-century American male writers
20th-century American novelists
American fantasy writers
American male novelists
American science fiction writers
Living people
Year of birth missing (living people)